Ian Martin Duthie (18 January 1930 – 27 June 2010) was a Scottish professional footballer who played as a striker for Forfar Celtic, Huddersfield Town, Bradford City, Witton Albion and Northwich Victoria. He was born in Trumperton, Forfar, Scotland. His time at Huddersfield Town was interrupted by National service.

He married the daughter of fellow professional football player, Roy Goodall, who captained England in the early 1930s, and had two children and two grandchildren.

He was an archetypal Scottish lad o' parts. As well as playing football he served an apprenticeship as a painter and decorator, undertook teacher training, became a lecturer in interior decorating at Northwich School of Art and then a senior lecturer at Huddersfield Polytechnic. After gaining further qualifications he was awarded a degree in education at Leeds University and a master's degree at Sheffield University.

References 

1930 births
2010 deaths
People from Forfar
Association football midfielders
Scottish footballers
Huddersfield Town A.F.C. players
Bradford City A.F.C. players
Witton Albion F.C. players
English Football League players
Footballers from Angus, Scotland
Northwich Victoria F.C. players
Alumni of the University of Leeds
Academics of the University of Huddersfield
Alumni of the University of Sheffield